The X was a French automobile produced between 1908 and 1909.  Little is known about the marque, other than the fact that "an unknown quantity" was manufactured at Kremlin-Bicêtre, and that one model was shown at the 1908 Paris Salon.

Defunct motor vehicle manufacturers of France